Petrucelli is a surname. Notable people with the surname include:

 Chris Petrucelli (born 1962), American soccer manager
 John Petrucelli (born 1992), American-Italian basketballer
 Michael Petrucelli, American executive

See also
 Jack Petruccelle (born 1999), Australian footballer
 Petrocelli (surname), surname

Italian-language surnames